Stephanie Beroes is a filmmaker and artist.

She was born in 1954 in Pittsburgh, Pennsylvania. She completed a Bachelor of Arts from the University of Pittsburgh in Film History. She holds a Master of Fine Arts in Filmmaking from San Francisco Art Institute.

She is regarded as an avant-garde feminist filmmaker. Her most well known work is Debt Begins at 20, a quasi-fiction documentary about the Pittsburgh punk scene.

Films 
Light Sleeping (1974) sound; 4 min.

The American Mutoscope Company (1975) sound; 14 min.

Shadowplay (1977) sound; 6 min.

Recital (1978) sound; 20 min.

Valley Fever (1979) color, sound; 25 min.

Debt Begins at 20 (1980) black-and-white, sound; 40 mins.

Dream Screen (1986)

External links 
 The new wave legend that never was: Pittsburg's (sic) The Cardboards

References 

Living people
University of Pittsburgh alumni
San Francisco Art Institute alumni
1954 births
People from Pittsburgh
American filmmakers